For You: Kimi no Tame ni Dekiru Koto (For You ～君のためにできること～) is the fourth Japanese single (counted as third) by the South Korean boy band 2AM. It was released in September 12, 2012 in three different editions.

This title track is their first original Japanese single. Also included in this album is a remake of Fukuyama Masaharu 最愛 (Salai).

Track listing

Limited edition Ver. B is also a CD only version + 32p booklet.

References

External links 
 Official Website
 Japanese Official Website

2012 songs
Japanese-language songs